Stephen Gerard Woods (born 23 February 1970) is a Scottish football coach who currently works as a goalkeeping coach for Celtic.

Woods played as a goalkeeper for Hibernian, Clydebank, Preston North End, Motherwell and St Mirren.

After retiring as a player in 2005, Woods worked as the goalkeeping coach for Livingston and Dunfermline Athletic. He was appointed to a full-time coaching position with Celtic in 2007. Alex McLeish appointed Woods to an assistant coaching position with the Scotland national team in March 2018. He held this position until August 2021, when he was succeeded by Chris Woods.

References

External links

1970 births
Living people
Footballers from Glasgow
Scottish footballers
Association football goalkeepers
Hibernian F.C. players
Clydebank F.C. (1965) players
Preston North End F.C. players
Motherwell F.C. players
St Mirren F.C. players
Scottish Football League players
Scottish Premier League players
English Football League players
Livingston F.C. non-playing staff
Dunfermline Athletic F.C. non-playing staff
Celtic F.C. non-playing staff
Association football goalkeeping coaches
Association football coaches